Clayton County International Park is a park located in Clayton County, Georgia, United States, in Jonesboro, south of Atlanta. Built for the beach volleyball competition for the 1996 Summer Olympics, the main venue is part of the Lakeview View Complex which is used for concerts.

The area surrounding the Complex is used for water parks, softball, soccer, fishing, and bike trails.

References
1996 Summer Olympics official report. Volume 1. p. 539.
1996 Summer Olympics official report. Volume 3. p. 464.
ClaytonParks.com map of venue.
ClaytonParks.com official website.

Venues of the 1996 Summer Olympics
Protected areas of Clayton County, Georgia
Defunct sports venues in Georgia (U.S. state)
Olympic volleyball venues
Sports venues in Georgia (U.S. state)
Parks in Georgia (U.S. state)
Beach volleyball venues in the United States